Franz Prohaska was an Austrian footballer. He played in five matches for the Austria national football team from 1915 to 1917.

References

External links
 

Year of birth missing
Year of death missing
Austrian footballers
Austria international footballers
Place of birth missing
Association footballers not categorized by position